Foundation's Fear (1997) is a science fiction novel by American writer Gregory Benford, set in Isaac Asimov's Foundation universe.  It is the first book of the Second Foundation trilogy, which was written after Asimov's death by three authors, authorized by the Asimov estate.

Plot summary 
Emperor Cleon I wants to appoint Hari Seldon as the First Minister of the Galactic Empire.  Powerful Trantor High Council member Betan Lamurk opposes the independent Seldon's appointment.  Seldon himself is reluctant to accept the position because of its time constraints pulling him away from the psychohistory project.  The project is led by Seldon, Yugo Amaryl, and Seldon's advanced humaniform robot-spouse Dors Venabili.   Seldon needs to carry favor with the emperor, however, and advises Cleon I informally.  For example, Seldon suggests a decree that erases terrorists' names from records, denying them immortality, discouraging chaotic actions.

Besides the psychohistorians, much of the novel's action revolves around advanced sentient simulations (sims) of Joan of Arc and Voltaire.  The sims have been recreated by Artifice Associates, a research company located in Trantor’s Dahl Sector.  Artifice Associates programmers Marq and Sybil plan to use the Joan/ Voltaire sims for two money-making projects.  First, Hari Seldon’s psychohistory project.  Second, Trantor’s Junin-Sector “Preservers vs Skeptics Society” debate whether mechanical beings endowed with artificial intelligence should be built.  And if so, whether they should receive full citizenship.  The Preservers’ champion will be Joan, the Skeptics’ champion Voltaire.

Hari Seldon and Dors Venabili flee Trantor, escaping High Council member Betan Lamurk's forces.  During their galactic odyssey, Hari and Dors experience virtual reality as chimpanzees on planet Panucopia.  They also visit helter-skelter New Renaissance world Sark.

Meanwhile, back on Trantor, sims Joan and Voltaire escape into Trantor's Mesh (Internet).  Joan and Voltaire interact with ancient aliens on the Mesh.  These aliens fled Trantor's physical space when terraforming robots arrived on Trantor more than 20,000 years ago. Via Joan and Voltaire, Hari allies with the mesh aliens.  The aliens aid Seldon's return to Trantor, and his defeat of High Council member Lamurk through tik-toks. The novel ends with Seldon accepting his position as Emperor Cleon's First Minister.

Reviews
Review by Curt Wohleber (1997) in Science Fiction Weekly, 10 March 1997
Review by Gary K. Wolfe (1997) in Locus, #435 April 1997
Review by Paul Di Filippo (1997) in Science Fiction Age, May 1997
Review by Nigel Brown (1997) in Interzone, #123 September 1997
Review by Don D'Ammassa (1997) in Science Fiction Chronicle, #193 October 1997
Review by William Paul Rutherford [as by William P. Rutherford] (1997) in The Zone and Premonitions, #6, Winter 1997-98
Review by K. V. Bailey (1997) in Foundation, #70 Summer 1997
Review by Mark L. Olson (1998) in Aboriginal Science Fiction, Spring 1998
Review by Matthew Appleton (1998) in The New York Review of Science Fiction, April 1998
Review [French] by Jean-Claude Dunyach (1998) in Galaxies, #9
Review by Steven H Silver (1998) in SF Site, Mid-March 1998, (1998)
Review by Colin Steele (2001) in SF Commentary, #77

Review [Portuguese] by Ricardo França (2014) in Somnium, Novembro 2014

References

Novels by Gregory Benford
Foundation universe books
1997 American novels
1997 science fiction novels